Otto Adalbert Schnee (31 December 1913 – 4 November 1982) was a Korvettenkapitän (corvette captain) with Nazi Germany's Kriegsmarine during World War II.

Career
Schnee was a member of Hitler’s Nazi party. He joined the Reichsmarine in April 1934. After serving aboard the light cruiser , he transferred to the U-boat arm in May 1937. He spent two years on board the Type IIB U-boat , under the command of Oberleutnant zur See Otto Kretschmer, completing five combat patrols as 1.WO (second-in-command), between October 1939 and January 1940.

Schnee's first command, from January to July 1940, was the Type IIA submarine , in which he sailed on only a single short patrol in April supporting "Operation Weserübung" (the invasion of Norway).

His next command, between July and October 1940, was the Type IIC U-boat . In her he sailed on three more patrols around the coasts of the British Isles sinking two ships for a total of 3,188 tons, and damaging one of 15,434 tons.

Schnee commanded the Type IIB training boat  during November 1940, but as this class of submarine were withdrawn from front-line service, in January 1941 Schnee was given command of the newer, larger Type VIIC U-boat .

Schnee sailed on seven combat patrols in U-201 between April 1941 and August 1942, sinking 19 merchant ships (totalling 87,001 tons) and damaged two others (13,386 tons). He also sank two British Royal Navy auxiliary warships, the fighter catapult ship  and the anti-submarine naval trawler . In August 1941 he was awarded the Knight's Cross of the Iron Cross, and in July 1942 with the Oak Leaves.

In October 1942 Schnee joined the BdU staff. In his position as the Geleitzugs-Admiralstabsoffizier, he planned and organized operations against Allied convoys.

In September 1944 Schnee took command of the new Elektroboot , one of only two Type XXI U-boats to go on patrol ( being the other). U-2511s first and only patrol began on 3 May 1945 at Bergen. The next day Schnee received the cease-fire order, prior to the German surrender, and a few hours later spotted a group of British warships. Simulating an attack, he evaded the destroyer screen, closed to within  of the British cruiser , and then left the area without being detected. U-2511 returned to Bergen on 5 May to surrender as ordered. Schnee spoke to officers from Norfolk a few days later, who could not believe that U-2511 was able to get so close without any sonar contact. Schnee is said to have requested a comparison of the respective ships' logs, which confirmed his account. His Leitender Ingenieur (chief engineer) on this patrol was Gerd Suhren.

Post-war
After the war Schnee was not tried for his Nazi activities. He served for six months in the German Mine Sweeping Administration. Although appearing for the defence, Schnee was forced to admit he would not have acted as Eck did. He then worked for some years as a commercial representative before becoming the director of a sailing school on Elba. He was also for many years the chairman of the Verband Deutscher Ubootfahrer (association of German submarine crews). In 1980 Schnee published an article in the official VDU periodical defending the German festivities following the funeral of Admiral Dönitz, which had been severely criticized, and in which not only war veterans but also members of German Neo-Nazi associations had taken part. He said that the German song Deutschland, Deutschland über alles (Germany, Germany above everything) had been “spontaneously sung by the crowd, including the first verse” and had been “the most beautiful farewell present for the deceased man.” Schnee died in 1982.

Awards
 Wehrmacht Long Service Award (8 April 1938)
 Iron Cross (1939)
 2nd Class (21 October 1939)
 1st Class (15 August 1940)
 Sudetenland Medal (20 December 1939)
 U-boat War Badge (1939) (27 November 1939)
 Knight's Cross of the Iron Cross with Oak Leaves
 Knight's Cross on 30 August 1941 as Oberleutnant zur See and commander of U-201
 105th Oak Leaves on 15 July 1942 as Kapitänleutnant and commander of U-201

References

Notes

Bibliography

 
 

1913 births
1982 deaths
German military personnel of the Spanish Civil War
Recipients of the Knight's Cross of the Iron Cross with Oak Leaves
Reichsmarine personnel
Military personnel from Kiel
People from the Province of Schleswig-Holstein
U-boat commanders (Kriegsmarine)
Kriegsmarine personnel of World War II